Spodnji Gabernik is a settlement in the Municipality of Rogaška Slatina in eastern Slovenia. The entire area is part of the traditional region of Styria. It is now included in the Savinja Statistical Region.

Name
The name of the village was changed from Spodnji Gabrnik to  Spodnji Gabernik in 2002.

Church
The local church is dedicated to Saint Rosalia and belongs to the Parish of Kostrivnica. It was first mentioned in written documents dating to 1545, but the current single-nave building with a small bell tower saddling the roof at its western end was rebuilt in 1861.

Notable people
Notable people that were born or lived in Spodnji Gabernik include:
 Bertha von Suttner (1843–1914), Austrian-Bohemian pacifist and novelist

References

External links
Spodnji Gabernik on Geopedia

Populated places in the Municipality of Rogaška Slatina